Rowling end is a peak in the Lake District about 433 meters it is a steep slope leading up towards Causey Pike. It is briefly mentioned in books however they mainly focus on Causey Pike. The summit has a small kern on it amongst the heather and other shrubs and plants.

References
A Pictorial Guide to the Lakeland Fells,The North Western Fells:Alfred Wainwright: 
Complete Lakeland Fells, Bill Birkett, 

Fells of the Lake District